Gabriel Arellano Concepcion (born November 5, 1964) is a Filipino actor, singer and businessman. He began his show business career in the 1980s as a teen commercial model and is known for his debonair career in Philippine cinema, spanning several romanticized associations.

Family
Concepcion was born in San Juan (then part of Rizal province), Philippines to Rolando "Rollie" Concepcion and Maria Lourdes Arellano. He attended Miriam College and Lincoln University.

His great grandfather is the Filipino painter and architect Juan Arellano.

Career
Concepcion first appeared as a model in a 1980 Close-up toothpaste commercial.

Introduced into show business at age 15, he starred in the Regal Films production Katorse (English: Fourteen). From 1980–1995, he made 80 films and had several modeling and endorsement advertisements.

On November 13, 1988, Concepcion left for the United States despite not yet finishing his scenes for the film Pahiram ng Isang Umaga, directed by Ishmael Bernal, causing the film's intended release date of December 25 (for the 1988 Metro Manila Film Festival) to be moved next year.

In 1993, he ventured to the United States for a real estate career. In 2008, he returned part-time to Philippine show business and was accepted by the Filipino people despite his controversial abandonment many years ago.

Personal life
Concepcion married the following women: 
Sharon Cuneta —  (1984–1987); issue of daughter, actress and model Kristina Cassandra Concepcion. 
Jenny Syquia — (1993—1996); issue of daughter, beauty queen titleholder Cloie Helena Syquia Skarne. 
Genevieve Yatco Gonzales — (2004—present); issued of two daughters, Samantha and Savannah Concepcion.

During the 1990s, Concepcion partnered with:
Grace Ibuna — issue of daughter, musician Maria Gabrielle Ibuna Concepcion.

Filmography

Television

Film

Awards and nominations

Discography

References

External links
 

1964 births
ABS-CBN personalities
Star Magic
Ateneo de Manila University alumni
Filipino male television actors
Filipino male comedians
Businesspeople from Metro Manila
21st-century Filipino male singers
Filipino singer-songwriters
Filipino people of Spanish descent
GMA Network personalities
Living people
Filipino male film actors